The LCL Subdivision is a railroad line owned by CSX Transportation in the U.S. state of Kentucky. At its north end the line continues as a branch of the Cincinnati Terminal Subdivision, and at its south end the line continues as the Louisville Terminal Subdivision.

See also
 List of CSX Transportation lines

References

CSX Transportation lines
Transportation in Kenton County, Kentucky
Transportation in Boone County, Kentucky
Transportation in Grant County, Kentucky
Transportation in Gallatin County, Kentucky
Transportation in Carroll County, Kentucky
Transportation in Trimble County, Kentucky
Transportation in Henry County, Kentucky
Transportation in Oldham County, Kentucky
Transportation in Louisville, Kentucky